David Gates (born January 8, 1947) is an American journalist and novelist. His works have been shortlisted for the National Book Critics Circle Award and the Pulitzer Prize.

Education
Gates obtained his B.A. from the University of Connecticut in 1972.

Career
Gates' first novel, Jernigan (1991), about a dysfunctional one-parent family, was a Pulitzer Prize finalist in 1992 and a finalist for the National Book Critics Circle Award. This was followed by a second novel, Preston Falls (1998), and two short story collections, The Wonders of the Invisible World (1999) and A Hand Reached Down to Guide Me (2015).

Gates has published short stories in The New Yorker, Tin House, Newsweek, The New York Times Book Review, Bookforum, Rolling Stone, H.O.W, The Oxford American, The Journal of Country Music, Esquire, Ploughshares, GQ, Grand Street, TriQuarterly, and The Paris Review. Gates is also a Guggenheim Fellow.

Journalism
Until 2008, Gates was a senior writer and editor in the Arts section at Newsweek magazine, specializing in articles on books and music.

Teaching
Gates teaches in the graduate writing program at The University of Montana as well as at the Bennington Writing Seminars. Here he is a member of the Dog House Band, performing on the guitar, pedal steel, and vocals.

References

External links
Ploughshares articles by or about David Gates
Bombsite.com– Biography
Random House– Interview with David Gates
Salon.com– "Spiritual Chapter 11"
New York Times, "Books of The Times; Inspecting the Ruins Of a Contemporary Life", A review of Jernigan, May 24, 1991
Salon.com - "Breaking Up With the Beats"

1947 births
Living people
20th-century American novelists
American male journalists
American male novelists
Place of birth missing (living people)
20th-century American male writers
20th-century American non-fiction writers